Przemysław Saleta (born 7 March 1968) is a Polish professional boxer, as well as a former kickboxer and mixed martial artist.

Achievements
Kickboxing:
1990 W.A.K.O. World Championships in Madrid, Spain   -91 kg (Full-Contact)
1990 W.A.K.O. World Championships in Mestre, Italy   -91 kg (Full-Contact)
I.S.K.A. world champion
I.S.K.A. European champion
Polish Championship

Boxing:
2002 E.B.U. European heavyweight champion (0 title defences)
2001 Polish international heavyweight champion
1999 I.B.O. intercontinental cruiserweight champion (0 title defences)
1994 W.B.C. international cruiserweight champion
1992 Florida State cruiserweight champion (2 title defences)

Boxing
After a successful kickboxing career, Saleta became a professional boxer in 1991, fighting at cruiserweight. He won his first three fights by knockout before suffering his first defeat at the hands of Tim Martin in his fourth bout in 1992. After a one-point victory over an aging Dennis Andries in 1994, he was named as part of Ring Magazine'''s Top 10. He fell out of that list later that year, however, when he was knocked out by John McClain in the first round.

In 1995, he moved up to the heavyweight division and on December 9, 1995, he fought Croatian Željko Mavrović for the EBU Heavyweight title, but lost by KO in the first round.

He then remained inactive for almost two years. In May 2001, he won the Polish Heavyweight Championship by beating Ratko Draskovic via unanimous decision and on July 20, 2002, he was given another shot at the European title against the unbeaten defending champion Luan Krasniqi. Krasniqi dominated the start of the fight and was clearly well ahead on points. In the second half of the fight, he suffered stamina problems that led him to give up after the eighth round.

In his first defense of the European Championship title three months later, he met Sinan Samil Sam and was knocked out in the seventh round. Also, in the subsequent rematch against Krasniqi, he lost by TKO in the first. After a further two-year break, he returned in 2005 to beat Raman Sukhaterin and then again in a loss to Oliver McCall. In his last bout before retirement from the sport, he defeated American Ed Perry by unanimous decision in February 2006 to bring his record to 43 wins and 7 losses.

Mixed martial arts
On June 2, 2007, Saleta made his mixed martial arts debut against Belarusian opponent Martin Malhasyan at KSW VII. He lost the fight by a rear-naked choke in the first round.

Despite his retirement from  professional sport, he then returned to action after calling out fellow ex-boxer Marcin Najman at KSW XIV in September 2010. Both used to be friends and are known to have an ongoing feud which goes back a number of years.
Personal insults in press happened regularly before and even after the fight, which Saleta won by submission due to a forearm choke.

Media career
From January 2007 to November 2007, Saleta was part of the Polish edition of Gentleman's Magazine, and from September 28 to November 16, 2007, he was a contestant on the Polish version of Dancing on Ice. His partner was Agata Rosłońska. However, they resigned after the 8th round of the program. He also took part in the Polish version of Fort Boyard. Since October 6, 2008, he has been running his program Gadżety Salety'' on Polsat Play Channel.

Private life 

He was married twice. His first wife was Ewa Pacula, a former Polish model. They have a daughter named Nicola, born in 1994.  His second wife was Ewa Byzdra-Saleta.  They have a daughter named Nadia, born in 2002.

K-1 record

Mixed martial arts record

|-
| Win
| align=center| 1-1 
| Marcin Najman
| Submission (forearm choke)
| KSW 14: Judgment Day
| 
| align=center| 1
| align=center| 3:14
| Lódz, Poland
| 
|-
| Loss
| align=center| 0-1
| Martin Malchasjan
| Submission (rear-naked choke)
| KSW VII
| 
| align=center| 1
| align=center| 2:43
| Warsaw, Poland
| MMA debut

Professional boxing record

References

External links

 
 Saleta on Sherdog

1968 births
Living people
Sportspeople from Wrocław
Polish male kickboxers
Heavyweight boxers
Polish male mixed martial artists
Heavyweight mixed martial artists
Mixed martial artists utilizing boxing
Mixed martial artists utilizing kickboxing
European Boxing Union champions
Polish male boxers